Kevin Taylor may refer to:

Kevin Taylor (Australian footballer) (born 1958), Australian rules footballer 
Kevin Taylor (boxer) (born 1963), British Olympic boxer
Kevin Taylor (soccer) (born 1983), American soccer player
Kevin Taylor (English footballer) (born 1961), English footballer 
Kevin Taylor (rugby league) (1946–2020), English rugby league footballer who played in the 1960s, 1970s and 1980s
Kevin Taylor (serial killer) (born 1974), American serial killer